Lorenzo Bereciartúa y Balerdi (February 28, 1895 – October 23, 1968) was a Spanish bishop.

Balerdi was born in Bidegoyan, Guipúzcoa.  He was consecrated Auxiliary Bishop of Zaragoza on August 11, 1946. Appointed Bishop of Sigüenza-Guadalajara in July 1955. He was appointed Bishop of San Sebastián on August 30, 1963. He died in Pamplona, aged 73.

1895 births
1968 deaths
Participants in the Second Vatican Council